Conus eversoni is a species of sea snail, a marine gastropod mollusk in the family Conidae, the cone snails and their allies.

Like all species within the genus Conus, these snails are predatory and venomous. They are capable of "stinging" humans, therefore live ones should be handled carefully or not at all.

Description 
Original description: "Shell small, slender, tapered, with sharp-angled shoulder; spire flattened with elevated mamillate protoconch; body whorl smooth, polished, with 10 spiral cords around anterior end; spire whorl with 4 spiral cords; shell color dark reddish-brown with variable number of spiral rows of dark brown, tiny dots; paler reddish-brown band around mid-body; spire whorls with numerous evenly-spaced, dark brown flammules; early whorls and protoconch pale tan; interior of aperture purple."

The maximum recorded shell length is 18 mm.

Distribution
Locus typicus: "South coast of Utila Island, Bay Islands, Honduras."

This species occurs in the Caribbean Sea off Honduras.

Habitat 
Minimum recorded depth is 20 m. Maximum recorded depth is 20 m.

References

 Petuch E.J. (1987). New Caribbean molluscan faunas. Charlottesville, Virginia: The Coastal Education and Research Foundation. 154 pp., 29 pls; addendum 2 pp., 1 pl.
 Petuch, E. J. 1998a. Molluscan discoveries from the tropical western Atlantic region. Part 5. New species of Conus from the Bahamas, Honduran Banks, San Blas Archipelago, and northeastern South America. La Conchiglia 30(287):25–37, 21 figs.
 Filmer R.M. (2001). A Catalogue of Nomenclature and Taxonomy in the Living Conidae 1758 – 1998. Backhuys Publishers, Leiden. 388pp.
 Tucker J.K. & Tenorio M.J. (2009) Systematic classification of Recent and fossil conoidean gastropods. Hackenheim: Conchbooks. 296 pp.
 Rabiller M. & Richard G. (2019). Conidae offshore de Guadeloupe : Description du matériel dragué lors de l'expédition KARUBENTHOS 2 contenant de nouvelles espèces. Xenophora Taxonomy. 24: 3–31.

External links
 The Conus Biodiversity website
 
 Puillandre N., Duda T.F., Meyer C., Olivera B.M. & Bouchet P. (2015). One, four or 100 genera? A new classification of the cone snails. Journal of Molluscan Studies. 81: 1–23

eversoni
Gastropods described in 1987